Vacca may refer to:

Vacca (surname)
Vacca (grammarian), 6th Century grammarian
Vacca (rapper) (born 1979), Italian rapper
Lago della Vacca, lake in Lombardy, Italy
Victorian Aboriginal Child Care Agency in Victoria, Australia